Mahesh (born 3 May 1990) is an Indian actor who has appeared in Tamil language films. He made his debut in the 2010 film, Angadi Theru, directed by Vasanthabalan.

Career
Mahesh was spotted by Vasanthabalan's assistants while playing for his school in a volleyball match in Tirunelveli and the director's team asked him to audition for a role in Angadi Theru. Despite rejecting their advances initially, he eventually agreed to join the team after finishing his board examinations and after being encouraged by his sports mentor to pursue a career in films. The film subsequently released in March 2010 to positive reviews, with Mahesh's performance being well received by critics.

However, since Angadi Theru, Mahesh has only been seen in low budget films with his immediate release Konjam Siripu Konjam Kobam (2011) taking a low key box office opening to poor reviews, while Yasakhan met with a similar fate. In 2014, he played the fiancé of Janagi in the French film Son épouse, which was set in Tamil Nadu. In 2015, he appeared in two further unnoticed films which had delayed releases, Iravum Pagalum Varum alongside Ananya and Buddhanin Sirippu, co-starring Mithra Kurian and Samuthirakani.

Filmography

References

External links

Indian male film actors
Tamil male actors
Living people
1988 births
People from Dindigul district
Male actors from Tamil Nadu
Male actors in Tamil cinema